Abel Prieto Jiménez (born 11 November 1950) is a Cuban politician. Abelito, as he was called as a child,  is the son of Abel Prieto, a Cuban educator who for several years pre and post Castro ran a preparatory school on Pinar Del Rio. From 1997 to 2012 and from 2016 to the present he has served as Minister of culture. In March 2012 he was appointed advisor to Cuban President Raul Castro.

He is also a published author of fiction.

In his book Music and Revolution, Robin D. Moore says that, as minister of culture, Prieto "supported the greater international mobility of artists and extends them more autonomy in the licensing of their works abroad. He has stood up for the free circulation of controversial films such as Guantanamera and the creation of statues to figures such as John Lennon."

See also

Council of Ministers of Cuba
Culture of Cuba

References

External links
Cubaminrex

Government ministers of Cuba
Living people
Cuban male novelists
Communist Party of Cuba politicians
University of Havana alumni
1950 births